Champion is an unincorporated community in Marquette County in the U.S. state of Michigan.  The community is located within Champion Township.  As an unincorporated community, Champion has no legally defined boundaries or population statistics of its own.

History
A post office called Champion has been in operation since 1869. The community took its name from the nearby Champion Iron Mine.

See also
Sam Cohodas Lodge

References

Unincorporated communities in Marquette County, Michigan
Unincorporated communities in Michigan